Millidgea is a genus of Central African dwarf spiders that was first described by G. H. Locket in 1968.

Species
 it contains three species:
Millidgea convoluta Locket, 1968 (type)– Angola
Millidgea navicula Locket, 1968 – Angola
Millidgea verrucosa Locket, 1968 – Angola

See also
 List of Linyphiidae species (I–P)

References

Endemic fauna of Angola
Araneomorphae genera
Linyphiidae
Spiders of Africa